Really Big! is the second album by saxophonist Jimmy Heath featuring big band performances recorded in 1960 and originally released on the Riverside label.

Reception

Scott Yanow of Allmusic says, "Jimmy Heath's first chance to lead a fairly large group, an all-star ten-piece, found him well featured both on tenor and as an arranger/composer... A well-conceived set".

Track listing
All compositions by Jimmy Heath except as indicated
 Big "P" - 3:53    
 Old Fashioned Fun - 4:34    
 Mona's Mood - 4:53    
 Dat Dere (Bobby Timmons) - 4:24    
 Nails - 4:47    
 On Green Dolphin Street (Bronisław Kaper, Ned Washington) - 4:42    
 My Ideal (Richard A. Whiting, Newell Chase, Leo Robin) - 4:10    
 Picture of Heath - 4:30

Personnel
Jimmy Heath - tenor saxophone
Nat Adderley - cornet
Clark Terry - flugelhorn, trumpet
Tom McIntosh - trombone
Dick Berg - French horn
Cannonball Adderley - alto saxophone
Pat Patrick - baritone saxophone
Tommy Flanagan - piano
Cedar Walton - piano
Percy Heath - bass
Albert Heath - drums
Orrin Keepnews - producer
Ray Fowler - engineer

References

1960 albums
Riverside Records albums
Jimmy Heath albums
Albums arranged by Jimmy Heath